Chionocharis is a genus of flowering plants belonging to the family Boraginaceae.

Its native range is Himalaya to China.

Species:
 Chionocharis hookeri (C.B.Clarke) I.M.Johnst.

References

Boraginaceae
Boraginaceae genera